This is a list of West Coast Conference champions in college baseball.  The West Coast Conference is composed of nine schools, all of which participate in baseball, with each school playing all of the others in three game series.  Brigham Young University joined the league in 2012.  From 1999 through 2005, the eight teams were divided into two divisions, with the winner of each meeting in a three game championship series.  Division were abolished beginning in 2006, but the championship series remained through the 2009 season with the top two teams from the regular season meeting.  The league will begin a four team tournament in 2013, in anticipation of growing to a ten team conference when the University of the Pacific joins the league.  The winner of the tournament will claim the conference's automatic bid to the NCAA Division I Baseball Championship.

The conference began sponsoring baseball under the name West Coast Athletic Conference in 1968 and crowned a champion each year through 1976.  Beginning in 1977, the league joined with the Big West Conference for baseball, with competition in two separate conferences - the Northern California Baseball Association and the Southern California Baseball Association.  This arrangement lasted through the 1984 season, when the league once again began sponsoring baseball for its members.  In 1989, the conference shortened the name to West Coast Conference.

Champions

West Coast Athletic Conference

Northern California Baseball Association

Southern California Baseball Association

West Coast Athletic Conference/West Coast Conference

References

Champions
West Coast Conference